is a subprefecture of Hokkaido Prefecture, Japan. As of 2004, its estimated population is 373,736 and its area is 6,558.26 km2.

Geography

Cities
10 cities are located in Sorachi Subprefecture:

Towns and villages by district
These are the towns and villages in each district:

Mergers

History 
1897: Sorachi Subprefecture established.
1899: Furano Village (now Kamifurano Town, Nakafurano Town, Furano City, and Minamifurano Town) transferred to Kamikawa Subprefecture.
2010: Horokanai town from Uryū District transferred to Kamikawa Subprefecture.

External links
Official website 

Subprefectures in Hokkaido